My Midnight Creeps (initiated 2003 in Oslo, Norway) was a Norwegian rock band fronted by deceased Madrugada-guitarist Robert Burås and Ricochets-guitarist Alex Kloster-Jensen.

Biography 
Other members included Dag Stiberg on tenor saxophone, Behzad Farazollahi on drums, Anders Møller on percussion and Raymond Jensen on bass. Keyboardist Mikael Lindqvist also appeared on their first album, My Midnight Creeps. The band's music carried inspiration from The Stooges, as well as The Rolling Stones and The Animals. Their critically acclaimed second album Histamin received six out of six points in a review in Norwegian newspaper Verdens Gang.

Following the death of Burås on July 12, 2007, My Midnight Creeps was quickly dissolved, however, in 2011 the remaining members of the band (with the exception of bassist Jensen, who was replaced by ex-Madrugada bassist Frode Jacobsen) started a new project named Kitchie Kitchie Ki Me O.  They released their self-titled debut in June 2011 with a follow up entitled Are You Land Or Water? released in January 2016.  The band is named after a My Midnight Creeps song from the album Histamin, and is musically very different from its predecessor, making heavy use of intricate rhythms and female backing vocals with their second album heading in a more dark and ambient musical direction.

Honors 
2007: Spellemannprisen in the category Rock music, for the album Histamin

Discography 

2005: My Midnight Creeps (MMC Records)
2007: Histamin (EMI Music)

References

External links
My Midnight Creeps on Myspace

Spellemannprisen winners
Norwegian rock music groups
Norwegian alternative rock groups
Norwegian progressive rock groups
Musical groups established in 2005
2005 establishments in Norway
Musical groups disestablished in 2007
2007 disestablishments in Norway
Musical groups from Oslo